Drzetowo is located in Poland, an historical municipal neighbourhood of the City of Szczecin. It was merged with another historical neighbourhood (Grabowo) and has formed present Drzetowo-Grabowo neighbourhood.

History 
Before 1945 when Szczecin (Stettin) was a part of Germany, the German name of this suburb was Stettin-Bredow, or just Bredow. Historically, when part of Germany, the Vulcan iron-works and shipbuilding yards were located here. There were also sugar, cement and other factories.

References 

Drzetowo